Serra das Traíras is a mountain range in southern Tocantins, Brazil. An unnamed peak at the municipality of Paranã is the highest point in Tocantins, reaching .

References 

Trairas
Landforms of Tocantins
Highest points of Brazilian states